Peter M. Bentler is an American psychologist, statistician, and distinguished professor at the University of California, Los Angeles.

In multivariate analysis and psychometrics, Bentler is the developer of the structural equation modeling software EQS. Bentler received a doctorate in clinical psychology from Stanford University in 1964. His publications have over 260,000 citations . In 2014, he was awarded the Psychometric Society Career Award. In 2015, he was elected Fellow of the American Statistical Association.

References

External links 
 

Year of birth missing (living people)
Living people
20th-century American psychologists
University of California, Los Angeles faculty
Fellows of the American Statistical Association
American statisticians
Psychometricians
20th-century American mathematicians
21st-century American mathematicians
21st-century American psychologists
21st-century American scientists
Quantitative psychologists